Smithia purpurea is a species of plant in the Fabaceae family.

Description
Leaves are pinnate, leaflets with a bristle at the tip. Flowers purple, about 1 cm across, occur in racemes of 6-12 flowers. The standard petal has two bright white dots.

Range
Western Ghats, India

Habitat

Ecology
In patches on open plateaux, banks of streamlets, road sides and farm bunds of Gghat regions. More frequently encountered near village environs and disturbed places.

Etymology
The genus is named after British botanist and physician Sir James Edward Smith and the specific epithet refers to the purple colour of the flower.

References

Flora of India (region)
Taxa named by William Jackson Hooker
Plants described in 1847
Dalbergieae